Anna-Maria Reich, née Fiegert (born 3 April 1994) is a German ice hockey player for the Minnesota Blue J's and the German national team.

She participated at the 2015 IIHF Women's World Championship.

Career statistics

NCAA

German national team

References

External links

1994 births
Living people
Minnesota State Mavericks women's ice hockey players
German women's ice hockey defencemen
German expatriate ice hockey people
German expatriate sportspeople in the United States
Minnesota Whitecaps players
Sportspeople from Landshut
Ice hockey players at the 2012 Winter Youth Olympics

Minnesota State University, Mankato alumni